Moonraisers are a reggae band formed in 1992 and based in Neuchâtel, Switzerland.  Their style, a type of electronic reggae dubbed World’n’Moonstyle Reggae, joins roots reggae with funk, world and electro elements. They are best known for composing the original version of the dance super hit, Rise up. Although at the time it came out it didn't make any success, the song became a hit played in the dance clubs for months after Yves Larock made a dance cover of it.

Discography

Albums 

 Mirror (13 self produced songs, 1996)
 1. Intro Nine Miles / 2. Get Up / 3. Joyless People	/ 4. Legal Destruction	/ 5. Right Way / 6. Mystic Dreams / 7. Surviving Children / 8. Make Change The World	/ 9. Rastaman Rebellation / 10. Moonrais Revolution / 11. Shining World / 12. No Want To Give Up / 13. Mirror / 14.Shamans Groove
 World Without Wars (5 self produced songs, 1997)
 1. Let Peace Rule / 2. 1st May 2000 / 3. Reggae 2000 / 4. Guilty / 5. Make Change The World
 Legacy (14 songs produced by The Source Music Production, Pedi Sterchi and Moonraisers, 1999)
 1. Dreams / 2. Thanks For All / 3. Not Afraid / 4. Hey World / 5. Time / 6. Four Crows / 7. New World / 8. Spirit Tango	/ 9. Music Evolution / 10. Can't Fly Too High / 11. Radja Ska / 12. Maconha / 13. Oh Child / 14. Hope Groove
 Live (9 self produced live songs, 2001)
 1. Can't Fly Too High (Live) / 2. Guilty (Live) / 3. Hey World (Live) / 4. New World (Live) / 5. Not Afraid (Live) / 6. Peanuts (Live) / 7. Spirit Tango (Live) / 8. Train Of Bagdad (Live)	/ 9. 4 Crows (Live)
 Human (12 songs produced byr P.Brunkow, 2003)
 1. Human / 2. 8 Giants / 3. Time Run / 4. Difference / 5. For Real / 6. Goes Around / 7. Congo Square / 8. Talking	/ 9. Slave Station / 10. So Much Trouble / 11. Who Can Prove It / 12. Full Moon 
 Do The Right Step (15 songs produced by Damp Music, 2007)
 1. Solidarity / 2. pPppet Master / 3. White Spliff	/ 4. Rise Up	/ 5. Funky Reggae Party / 6. Hotel California / 7. One God / 8. Rain A Fall	/ 9. To Those / 10. Why Take It / 11. Good Vibes / 12. $ Ship / 13. The Sun Shine For All / 14. Transition / 15. Intronisation

Singles 

 Goes Around (3 versions produced by P. Brunkow, 2003)
 1. Goes Around / 2. Goes Around (P.Brunkow Remix) / 3. Goes Around (Extended P.Brunkow Remix)
 Hotel California (2 versions produced by Damp Music and Moonraisers, 2007)
 1. Hotel California (Radio) / 2. Hotel California (Extendet)

References 

Website of the Band: http://www.moonraisers.com

Swiss reggae musical groups